Mayank Markande (born 11 November 1997) is an Indian cricketer.

Markande comes from from Patiala. He studied in Yadavindra Public School and was part of the school's cricket team. He made his international debut for the India cricket team in February 2019. He first attracted wider attention in the IPL 2018 opening match after taking the wicket of MS Dhoni.

Domestic career
Markande made his Twenty20 debut for Punjab in the 2017–18 Syed Mushtaq Ali Trophy on 14 January 2018. In January 2018, he was bought by Mumbai Indians in the 2018 IPL auction He made his List A debut for Punjab in the 2017–18 Vijay Hazare Trophy on 7 February 2018 in Bengaluru. and made his debut for the side during the season. In his first two matches he took seven wickets, including three on debut.

In October 2018, Markande was named in India B's squad for the 2018–19 Deodhar Trophy. He made his first-class debut for Punjab in the 2018–19 Ranji Trophy on 1 November 2018. He was the leading wicket-taker for Punjab in the tournament, with 29 dismissals in six matches.

In March 2019, he was named as one of eight players to watch by the International Cricket Council (ICC) ahead of the 2019 Indian Premier League tournament. In October 2019, he was named in India C's squad for the 2019–20 Deodhar Trophy.

In February 2022, he was bought back by the Mumbai Indians in the auction for the 2022 Indian Premier League tournament. On 23 December 2022, he was bought by Sunrisers Hyderabad for IPL 2023.

International career
In December 2018, he was named in India's team for the 2018 ACC Emerging Teams Asia Cup. In February 2019, he was named in India's Twenty20 International (T20I) squad for their series against Australia. He made his T20I debut for India against Australia on 24 February 2019.

References

External links
 

1997 births
Living people
Indian cricketers
India Twenty20 International cricketers
Punjab, India cricketers